Larry Paul Jacobson (born December 10, 1949) is a former professional football player, a defensive tackle for the New York Giants of the National Football League (NFL).  A first round selection in the 1972 NFL Draft (24th overall) and starter in his rookie year, his pro career was cut short by major injuries to the leg and foot.

Nebraska Cornhuskers
Jacobson grew up in Sioux Falls and graduated from O'Gorman High School in 1968, where he also played basketball. He played college football at Nebraska under head coach, Bob Devaney.  He was a key player of the "Blackshirts" (Nebraska defense) for the undefeated 1970 and 1971 teams, which won consecutive national championships.

During Jacobson's three seasons on the Huskers (1969–71), Nebraska was 33-2-1, with records of 9-2, 11-0-1, and 13-0, and three consecutive bowl victories. The 38-6 victory in the 1972 Orange Bowl over #2 Alabama was the Huskers' 22nd consecutive win, and 32nd without a loss.

As a senior, Jacobson was an All-American and won the Outland Trophy in 1971 for best interior lineman; the first of eight Outland Trophies won by Nebraska players. Husker (and Giant) teammate Rich Glover would win the award the following season in 1972. He also played in the Senior Bowl.

He was the third Nebraska Cornhusker chosen in the first round of the 1972 NFL Draft (QB Jerry Tagge - 11th, RB Jeff Kinney - 23rd).  A starter in his rookie year, Jacobson played three seasons with the Giants.  A broken leg in training camp in 1975 ended his playing career, as he failed his physical in 1976.

Jacobson was an accounting major at Nebraska, and an Academic All-American.After his brief NFL career, he became a stockbroker with Morgan Stanley.

References

Jacobson now resides in Nebraska with his wife Kathy Jacobson.

1949 births
Living people
All-American college football players
American football defensive ends
American football defensive tackles
Nebraska Cornhuskers football players
New York Giants players
Players of American football from South Dakota
Sportspeople from Sioux Falls, South Dakota
Stockbrokers
University of Nebraska–Lincoln alumni